= Gray Tractor Manufacturing Company =

Defunct tractor manufacturer

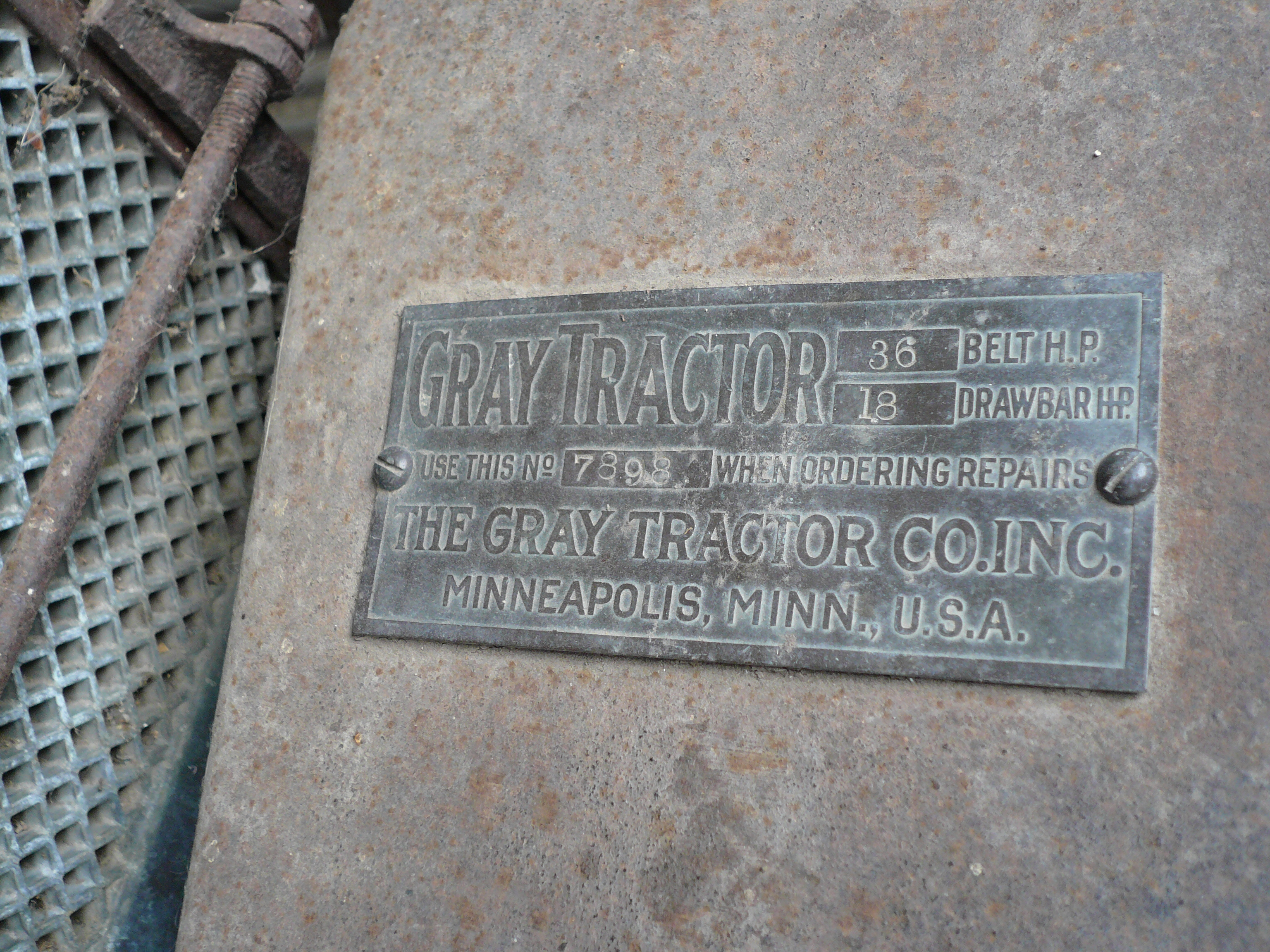
Manufacturer's placard on a Gray 18-36

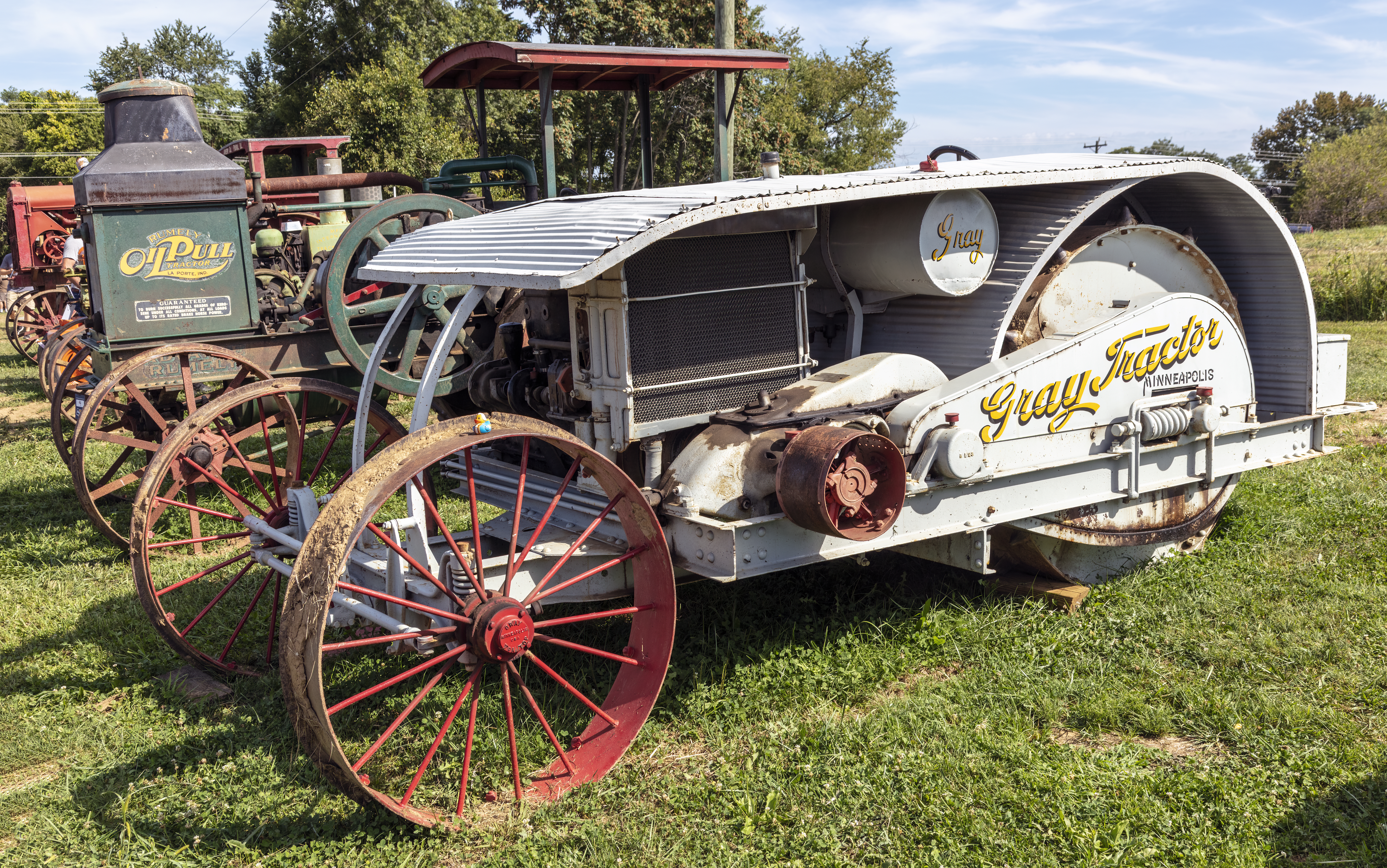
Gray 22-40

The Gray Tractor Manufacturing Company was a United States tractor brand. Between 1914 and 1933, seven different models were offered, ranging in power from 25 to 40 horsepower. Gray tractors employed a distinctive strategy to minimize soil compaction and optimize power transmission, employing an exceptionally wide drum instead of standard rear wheels, with conventional steel steering wheels at the front of the machine..

== History ==
Gray tractors originated from a design by W. Chandler Knapp, an orchard owner from New York State, who was seeking a useful machine for his own operation. In 1908, he built his first tractor; a year later, it was fitted with widely spaced rear wheels. Knapp developed the Knapp Farm Locomotive by 1913, using a drum, rather than drive wheels, with a low profile suited to orchard use. The engine in the last model was mounted transversely, to eliminate the need for bevel gears in the transmission, which instead used spur gears and a chain final drive. Production moved to Minneapolis, Minnesota, taking the name of the company's president, Joseph W. Gray.

In 1914, a model featuring a four-cylinder Waukesha engine was developed; following a sale to the Gray Tractor Manufacturing Company, the tractors began to be sold under the name of the company's owner, Joseph W. Gray. At this point, the rear wheels were also replaced entirely by a single chain-driven roller.

The last model offered was the "22-40 'Canadian Special'," available from 1923 to 1933 (and as the sole model from 1925 onwards). This model was designed for the Canadian market, to operate in snowy conditions. Production ceased in 1933, as sales had become increasingly difficult due to a lack of technical and design evolution. The drive concept also failed to gain widespread adoption because the tractors lacked a differential, making them insufficiently maneuverable.

== Products ==
Gray 22-40 seen from the rear

=== Model 13 (15-25) and Model A (20-35) ===
These tractors, with a belt power output of 15 hp and 20 hp respectively, were built between 1916 and 1918 and featured a kerosene-powered 4-cylinder Waukesha engine.

=== Model B (15-25) ===
These tractors, with a belt power output of 15 hp and 20 hp respectively, were built between 1916 and 1918 and featured a kerosene-powered 4-cylinder Waukesha engine.

=== 18-30 ===
This model, equipped with a 4-cylinder engine producing 18 hp, was offered from 1917 to 1920.

=== 18-36 ===
This best-selling model was sold from 1918 to 1921. It featured a 4-cylinder Waukesha vertical L-head engine with a displacement of 7,800 cc and an engine speed of 950 rpm. It weighed 2,950 kg.

=== 20-36 ===
126 This model was offered only in 1922 at a price of $1,975 (equivalent to 37988 USD today).

=== 22-40 ===
334 The final tractor developed with a 4-cylinder Waukesha vertical L-head engine produced 22 hp at the belt. It ran on kerosene. It weighed 3,130 kg.
